William Young (baptized 25 March 1843 – 1 November 1900) was a Scottish architect, the designer of Glasgow City Chambers.

Biography

Early life
Young was born in Paisley, Scotland in 1843, the son of James Young, a bootmaker and spirit dealer. He was baptized on 25 March that year.

Career
During the late 1850s he was articled to James Jamieson Lamb of Paisley, but moved in 1859 to the Glasgow office of William Nairne Tait. He then spent time in Manchester before settling in London in 1865 as an assistant in the office of Charles Henry Howell, the Surrey county surveyor. This move gave him the chance to study at the South Kensington School in preparation for starting up in independent practice in 1869. In 1870 he was commissioned by Lord Elcho to erect a 50,000 square feet timber marquee at Wimbledon Common for the National Rifle Brigade. This was followed by a commission in 1873 from Lord Elcho's brother-in-law, William Wells, MP, to build him a large Tudor Gothic style country house, Holmewood Hall, near Peterborough.

He set up in premises in the Strand and received a steady stream of commissions, including Haseley Manor, Warwick (1875), Peebles Parish Church (1885-7) and new wings for Gosford House, Lothian (1891). In London he designed Chelsea House, Cadogan Place (1874) for Earl Cadogan and competed unsuccessfully in the South Kensington Museum Competition of 1891. With the help of Lord Elcho, however, he was given the commission for the new War Office in Whitehall (later completed by his son, Clyde Francis Young). In addition to his design work he wrote a number of publications to advertise his work, such as "Town and Country Mansions and Suburban Houses" in 1873 and "Town and Country Mansions with Notes on the Sanitary and Artistic Construction of Houses" in 1878.

In 1881 he won the competition for Glasgow City Chambers in George Square, Glasgow. This building, built between 1881 and 1890, features the largest set of sculptures in the city, symbolizing aspects of the city's industrial, commercial and cultural achievement.

He was admitted FRIBA in 1891.

Death
He died in 1900 at 23 Oakhill Road, his home in Putney, London (which he designed himself in 1879), and was buried at Putney Vale Cemetery. His practice was continued after his death by his son Clyde, who completed the work in progress of his father, including the extensive alterations to Elveden Hall, Suffolk.

References

  
 

1843 births
1900 deaths
People from Paisley, Renfrewshire
Burials at Putney Vale Cemetery
19th-century Scottish architects
Fellows of the Royal Institute of British Architects